Throw It to the Universe is the sixth and final studio album by the Swedish band The Soundtrack of Our Lives.

One of the founding members of The Soundtrack of Our Lives, Björn Olsson, plays guitar and sings on three songs on the album. His photo can also be seen in the album credits.

Track listing

Personnel
Mattias Bärjed – guitar, backing vocals
Åke Karl Kalle Gustafsson – bass, backing vocals
Martin Hederos – piano, organ, violin, backing vocals
Ebbot Lundberg – lead vocals, autoharp
Ian Person – guitar, backing vocals
Fredrik Sandsten – drums, percussion, backing vocals

Additional personnel
Björn Olsson – guitar, backing vocals (on "Throw It to the Universe", "Busy Land" and "Shine On (There's Another Day After Tomorrow)")

References

2012 albums
The Soundtrack of Our Lives albums